With the help of a means of communication, people can communicate and exchange information with each other as an information sender and an information recipient.

General information 
We use many different materials in communication. Maps, for example, save you tedious explanations on how to get to your destination. A means of communication is therefore a means to an end to make communication between people easier, more understandable and, above all, clearer. In everyday language, the term means of communication is often equated with the medium. However, the term "medium" is used in media studies to refer to a large number of concepts, some of which do not correspond to everyday usage.

Means of communication are used for communication between sender and recipient and thus for the transmission of information. Elements of communication include a communication-triggering event, sender and recipient, a means of communication, a path of communication and contents of communication. The path of communication is the path that a message travels between sender and recipient; in hierarchies the vertical line of communication is identical to  command hierarchies. Paths of communication can be physical (e.g. the road as transportation route) or non-physical (e.g. networks like a computer network). Contents of communication can be for example photography, data, graphics, language, or  Texts.

Means of communication in the narrower sense refer to technical devices that serve to transmit information. They are the manifestations of contents of communication that can be perceived through the senses and replace the communication that originally ran from person to person and make them reproducible.

History of the term 
Up until the 19th century, the term was primarily applied to traffic and couriers and to means of transport and  transportation routes, such as railways, roads and canals, but also used to include post riders and stagecoachs. In 1861, the national economist Albert Schäffle defined a means of communication as an aid to the circulation of goods and financial services, which included, among other things, newspapers, telegraphy, mail, courier services, remittance advice,  Invoices and Bills of lading.

In the period that followed, the "technical means of communication" increasingly came to the foreground, so that as early as 1895 the German newspaper "Deutsches Wochenblatt" reported that these technical means of communication had been improved to such an extent that "everyone all over the world has become our neighbor".

Not until the 20th century was the term Medium also used as a synonym for these technical means of communication. In the 1920s the term mass media started to become more popular.

Different types 
A distinction can be made between oral, written, screen-oriented transfer of information and document transport:

In this table means of communication are mentioned that are no longer used today.

Furthermore, a distinction can be made between:
 natural communication:
 nonverbal communications: applause, gestures, facial expressions (social means of communication); flag signs;
 language:  communication forms such as meetings, discussions;
 technical communication:
 writing systems and drawings as data storage of language;
 Email, fax, teletype, mobile phones, mass media, SMS/MMS, telephone, webcam.
Means of communication in the narrower sense are those of technical communication.

In  companies (businesses,  government agencies, institutions) typical means of communication include documents, such as  analyses, business Cases, due Diligence Reviews,  financial analyses,  forms, business models, feasibility studies, scientific publications or Contracts.

Natural means of communication
The means of natural communication or the "primary medias" (see Media studies) include:
 Speech and other mouth-formed sounds, e.g. Screaming;
 Sign language using hand or body movements, e.g. winking;
 Other non-verbal means of communication include clothing (see dress code) and other forms of appearance, as well as different accentuations in the living, food and construction Culture.

Technical means of communication
 with hands or technical aids written  characters on paper or another substrate as a writing medium (letter, message);
 print media produced with the help of  printing technology;
 Playback of sounds or images (in Image Media) by record players such as tape recorders and projectors for  slide shows or movies;
 Transmission of speech by telephone or writing by  telegraph, mostly to a single addressee; satellite radio.

Communication theory 

Means of communication are often differentiated in  models of communication:
 in terms of  reaching and determining the target audience of a means of communication, whether individual communication, group communication and mass communication;
 in terms of the technical components in natural and technical means of communication;
 in terms of the  components of speech in  verbal and nonverbal communication.

Media as a means of communication in the future will be distinguished:
 by Data storage, broadcasting media and processing media, especially to record, reproduce and reduplicate media content.
 by primary, secondary, tertiary and quaternary media, depending on the technology used by sender and recipient.

Mass media 

Mass media refers to reaching many recipients from one - or less than one - sender simultaneously or nearly simultaneously. 

 Transmission of information via printing products in diverse forms (Book, flyer (pamphlet), Xerography, Poster, Mail merge, newspaper)
 Transmission of language, music or other sounds radio waven (Radio broadcasting)
 Transmission of visual image and sound via radio wave (Television)
 The most up-to-date means of communication in a long chain of innovation is the Internet
Due to their wide dissemination, mass media are suitable for providing the majority of the population with the same information.

See also 
 Media History
 Publication
 Social Media

Bibliography 
 General
 Lothar Hoffmann, Kommunikationsmittel: Fachsprache: eine Einführung, 1976
 Michael Franz, Electric Laokoon: Zeichen und Medien, von der Lochkarte zur Grammatologie, 2007, ISBN 978-3-05-003504-8
 Horst Völz, Das ist Information. Shaker Verlag, Aachen 2017, ISBN 978-3-8440-5587-0.

 Natural communication
 Jean Werner Sommer, Kommunikationsmittel: Wort und Sprache, 1970
 Beat Pfister, Tobias Kaufmann: Sprachverarbeitung: Grundlagen und Methoden der Sprachsynthese und Spracherkennung, 2008, ISBN 978-3-540-75909-6
 Renate Rathmayr, Nonverbale Kommunikationsmittel und ihre Versprachlichung, 1987
 Mass media
 Jörg Aufermann, Hans Bohrmann, Massenkommunikationsmittel, 1968
 Fritz Eberhard, Optische und akustische Massenkommunikationsmittel, 1967
 Theodor Bücher, Pädagogik der Massenkommunikationsmittel, 1967
 Hans Kaspar Platte, Soziologie der Massenkommunikationsmittel, 1965
 Social means of communication

Citations 

Communication studies
Telecommunications techniques
Communication